Kevin McAlea is an Irish keyboard player and songwriter, known for his work with Kate Bush, David Gilmour, and Barclay James Harvest and for writing English lyrics for the song "99 Luftballons", as the international hit "99 Red Balloons". He also plays saxophone, guitar and uilleann pipes. He has built several analogue synthesiser systems and had an early interest in electronic music.

McAlea was born in Belfast, Northern Ireland. He attended St. Malachy's College there.

Early in his career he played in Skid Row, an Irish band which had included future members of Thin Lizzy.

He performed with Kate Bush, on her only tour, 1979's "The Tour of Life", and again during her 2014 Hammersmith Apollo residency, "Before the Dawn". He played with David Gilmour on parts of his 2015/2016 world tour which included concerts at the Hollywood Bowl and Madison Square Garden. He has also worked with Bees Make Honey, Clannad, Barbara Dixon, Dr Feelgood, Enya, Roy Harper, Kirsty MacColl, Seal, Poly Styrene, and Kim Wilde.

He has a site with a library of traditional tunes and some recorded works, called Celtic Orbis, He also has released music under the same name.

Discography 

McAlea's career includes contributions to:

References

External links 

 
 

1949 births
Living people
Musicians from Belfast
Kate Bush
Keyboardists from Northern Ireland
Bees Make Honey (band) members